The Schwarzwaldpokal is a competition in Nordic combined. It is held since 1967 and since 1984 part of the FIS Nordic Combined World Cup.

Winners

See also

 Langenwaldschanze

FIS Nordic Combined World Cup 
Nordic combined competitions in Germany
Black Forest
Schwarzwald-Baar-Kreis